Rodrigo Peralta (born March 22, 1988) is a Mexican former stock car racing driver. Peralta won the 2013 NASCAR Toyota Series championship by eight points over Daniel Suarez. He competed in 58 NASCAR Mexico series races between 2010 and 2015. During his NASCAR career, Peralta won 2 races, had 25 top ten finishes, and 1 pole position.

Motorsports career results

NASCAR
(key) (Bold – Pole position awarded by qualifying time. Italics – Pole position earned by points standings or practice time. * – Most laps led.)

PEAK Mexico Series

References

External links
 

Living people
1988 births
NASCAR drivers
Racing drivers from Mexico City
Mexican racing drivers